Motor speech disorders are a class of speech disorders that disturb the body's natural ability to speak due to neurologic impairments. These neurologic impairments make it difficult for individuals with motor speech disorders to plan, program, control, coordinate, and execute speech productions. Disturbances to the individual's natural ability to speak vary in their etiology based on the integrity and integration of cognitive, neuromuscular, and musculoskeletal activities.  Speaking is an act dependent on thought and timed execution of airflow and oral motor / oral placement of the lips, tongue, and jaw that can be disrupted by weakness in oral musculature (dysarthria) or an inability to execute the motor movements needed for specific speech sound production (apraxia of speech or developmental verbal dyspraxia). Such deficits can be related to pathology of the nervous system (central and /or peripheral systems involved in motor planning) that affect the timing of respiration, phonation, prosody, and articulation in isolation or in conjunction.

Dysarthria

Dysarthria is  the reduced ability to motor plan volitional movements needed for speech production as the result of weakness/paresis and/or paralysis of the musculature of the oral mechanism needed for respiration, phonation, resonance, articulation, and/or prosody.

Apraxia

There are two types of Apraxia. Developmental (or Childhood Apraxia of speech) or acquired Apraxia. Childhood apraxia of speech (CAS) is a neurological childhood speech sound disorder that involves impaired precision and consistency of movements required for speech production without any neuromuscular deficits (ASHA, 2007a, Definitions of CAS section, para. 1). Both are the inability to plan volitional motor movements for speech production in the absence of muscular weakness. Apraxia is not a result of sensory problems, or physical issues with the articulatory structures themselves, simply the way the brain plans to move them.

Developmental verbal dyspraxia

Developmental verbal dyspraxia is a developmental inability to motor plan volitional movement for the production of speech in the absence of muscular weakness. Research has suggested links to the FOXP2 gene.

See also
 KE family

References

Neurological disorders
Communication disorders
Symptoms and signs: Speech and voice